Rani no Hajiro, also known as Mughalai Bibi's Tomb or Tombs of Ahmed Shah's Queens, is a tomb complex near Manek Chowk, Ahmedabad, India.

History and architecture 

Rani no Hajiro is located near Manek Chowk on east of the Ahmed Shah's Tomb. The enclosure is high above the ground entered by a lofty gateway and the courtyard surrounded by a trellised cloister. The walls of cloister are fitted with carved stone screens. The square open enclosure of 36.58 meters side is probably built in 1445. The courtyard contains eight marble tombs of queens of Ahmed Shah I and other Gujarat Sultanate rulers. They are elaborately carved and inlaid with work of mother-of-pearl and metal.

The principal tomb belongs to Mughalai Bibi, the wife of Muhammad Shah II and mother of Mahmud Begada. It is  richly carved in white marble, and girt with a Persian inscription in minute relief. An adjacent tomb in black marble,  once inlaid with mother-of-pearl, belongs to Mirki or Murki Bibi, the wife of Shah e Alam, the sister of queen and the daughter of Jam of Sindh. These tombs are covered with rich brocade works, the textile style developed during reign of Ahmed Shah I. The intricate stone tracery and carving is an amalgamation of Hindu, Jain, and Islamic architectural styles. Some Muslim families live inside complex which take care of the tombs.

Market
The area surrounding the complex is now a market for women's clothing, jewellery and accessories. Best Traditional Garba clothes are also sold there. Many types of mouth fresheners, Mukhwas, stalls are nearby.

Gallery

See also

 Ahmed Shah's Tomb

References 

 This article includes public domain text from 

Tombs in Ahmedabad
Monuments of National Importance in Gujarat